Tobita can refer to:
Tobita Shinchi (red light district) in Osaka, Japan
Nobuo Tobita, Japanese voice actor
Masaru Tobita (or "Survival Tobita"), Japanese professional wrestler
Ruki Tobita, Japanese snowboarder

See also

Tonita (name)